Chaudhry Ahmad Mukhtar (22 June 1946 – 25 November 2020) was a Pakistani politician and businessman who served as the Defence Minister of Pakistan in the PM Yousaf Raza Gillani-led cabinet. He also owned Servis Group and founded Shalimar Hospital.

He was a central leader of the Pakistan Peoples Party from Gujrat District and he defeated Chaudhry Shujaat Hussain from Gujrat NA-105 in 1993 & 2008, the leader of PML-Q party, who was allied with President Pervez Musharraf, in Pakistan's 2008 elections.

Early life and career
Born in Lahore, Ahmad Mukhtar did his Operational Management from California, United States and a Diploma in Plastic Technology from West Germany. Mukhtar was also a graduate of Forman Christian College University. He was a businessman who started his political career in 1990 on PPP platform. His brother Ahmad Saeed served as PIA Managing director (from April 2001) and PIA chairman (from April 2003, both until April 2005) during the General Pervez Musharraf era. Ahmad Mukhtar himself took the role of chairman PIA from May 2008.
He was an industrialist and served as Commerce Minister in the 1993–1996 Benazir Bhutto government. He was considered the most likely candidate to be the next Prime Minister of Pakistan, along with Ameen Faheem, Yousaf Raza Gillani and Shah Mehmood Qureshi, but was later denied, when Yousaf Raza Gillani was announced as the new PM on 22 March 2008. He became the Defence Minister in the coalition government of PPP, PML-N, ANP and JUI-F formed after 2008 elections on 31 March 2008. He was also the brother-in-law of former Pakistan Cricket Board (PCB) chairman, Ijaz Butt. He belonged to a Jat family of Gujrat.

Death
Ahmad Mukhtar died after prolonged illness on 25 November 2020, aged 74.

References

External links

 Minister of Textile Industry profile

Pakistan People's Party politicians
Defence Ministers of Pakistan
People from Gujrat District
Pakistani industrialists
2020 deaths
Punjabi people
1946 births
Water and Power Ministers of Pakistan
Pakistan International Airlines people
Politicians from Lahore
Commerce Ministers of Pakistan
St. Anthony's High School, Lahore alumni
Service Industries Limited
Forman Christian College alumni
Pakistani MNAs 1993–1996